Pseudopostega crepusculella is a moth of the family Opostegidae. It is found in Europe.

The wingspan is 7–10.5 mm. The forewings are white with an oblique rather dark fuscous streak from middle of costa, and another from middle of dorsum. A fuscous ill-defined subapical fascia is followed by two darker costal strigulae and there is a minute black apical dot. Hindwings fuscous. The moths fly from June to July depending on the location.

It is believed that the larvae feed on Mentha species.

References

External links
 Swedish Moths

Opostegidae
Moths of Japan
Moths of Europe
Moths of Asia
Moths described in 1839